Gabriel Maturin, D.D. was an Irish Anglican Dean.

Educated at Trinity College, Dublin, he was Dean of Kildare from 1737 to 1745 and Dean of St Patrick's Cathedral, Dublin, from 1745 until his death on 9 November 1746.

References

Christian clergy from Dublin (city)
Alumni of Trinity College Dublin
Irish Anglicans
Deans of St. Patrick's Cathedral, Dublin
1746 deaths